Tianjin Maoyan Culture Media is a Chinese company that owns the largest online movie ticketing website in China, maoyan.com, with 30% share of the market in 2015. In 2016, Wang Changtian of Beijing Enlight Media offered to buy a controlling stake in the company. The company also co-produces and co-distributes films.

Filmography
Wild City (2015)
To the Fore (2015)
SPL 2: A Time For Consequences (2015)
Monk Comes Down the Mountain (2015)
Lost in Hong Kong (2015)
Saving Mr. Wu (2015)
Mountains May Depart (2015)
A Fool (2015)
Surprise (2015)
Detective Chinatown (2015)
Boonie Bears III (2016)
The Mermaid (2016)
Mr. Nian (2016)
MBA Partners (2016)
New Happy Dad and Son 2: The Instant Genius (2016)
Heartfall Arises (2016)
Mr. Donkey (2016)
Sky on Fire (2016)
Some Like It Hot (2016)
Buddies in India (2017)
Revenge for Love (2017)
The Eleventh Chapter (2019)

References

Film distributors of China
Film production companies of China
Chinese film websites
Ticket sales companies
Online companies of China